Ilumina is a 2010 Philippine television drama fantasy series broadcast by GMA Network. Directed by Mark A. Reyes and Topel Lee, it stars Rhian Ramos, Aljur Abrenica and Jackie Rice. It premiered on August 2, 2010 on the network's Telebabad line up replacing Diva. The series concluded on November 19, 2010 with a total of 80 episodes.

The series is streaming online on YouTube.

Cast and characters

Lead cast
Rhian Ramos as Romana Sebastian
 Aljur Abrenica as Iñigo Salcedo
 Jackie Rice as Krisanta Sebastian

Supporting cast
 Cesar Montano as Romano Sebastian
 Jean Garcia as Elvira Montero Azardon de Salcedo and Melina Montero Azardon de Sebastian
 Ara Mina as Elsa Sebastian
 Christopher de Leon as Frederico Salcedo
 Paulo Avelino as Antonio Martinez
 Jake Vargas as Eliseo 
 Bea Binene as Evelina Abella
 Sef Cadayona as Renato
 Lexi Fernandez as Stephanie Martinez

Guest cast
 Daniella Amable as young Romana Sebastian
 Franchezka Lunar as young Krisanta Sebastian
 Rochelle Pangilinan as Elena
 Mia Pangyarihan as Micah
 Yassi Pressman as Ayra
 Izzy Trazona as Shanti
 Sam Pinto as Elizaria
 Carlene Aguilar as Salve
 Precinaida Lopez as Lupe 
 Deborah Sun as Pilar
 Cara Eriguel as Sasha
 Ella Cruz as Czarina
 Mika dela Cruz as Sinukuan
 Pen Medina as Francisco
 Arthur Solinap as Carpio
 Kiel Rodriguez as Chiron
 Mara Lopez as Ester
 Shyr Valdez
 Carla Abellana as Hannah
 Bianca King as Raina
 Jillian Ward as Shina
 Edwin Reyes as a mayor
 Jen Rosendahl as Carmen
 Nicole Dulalia as Tina

Ratings
According to AGB Nielsen Philippines' Mega Manila People/Individual television ratings, the pilot episode of Ilumina earned a 14.9% rating. While the final episode scored a 15% rating.

Accolades

References

External links
 
 

2010 Philippine television series debuts
2010 Philippine television series endings
Fantaserye and telefantasya
Filipino-language television shows
GMA Network drama series
Television about magic
Television shows set in the Philippines
Witchcraft in television